The 1997–98 Euroleague Women was the second edition of the Euroleague era of FIBA's premier international competition for European women's basketball clubs. It ran between 1 October 1997 and 9 April 1998.

Defending champion and Final Four host Bourges Basket won its second title beating Pool Getafe in the final. Pool Comense and US Valenciennes Olympic also reached the Final Four, with the Italians attaining the bronze.

Group stage

Group A

Group B

Quarter-finals

Final four
 Bourges, France

Individual statistics

Points

Rebounds

Assists

References

EuroLeague Women seasons